Hotel for Women (or Elsa Maxwell's Hotel for Women) is a 1939 American drama film directed by Gregory Ratoff and starring Ann Sothern, Linda Darnell, and James Ellison. It was Darnell's screen debut.

Plot
When she is jilted by her boyfriend, a young woman is encouraged to become a model by the women at the hotel where she is staying.

Production
The film's sets were designed by the art directors Richard Day and Joseph C. Wright.

Partial cast

References

Bibliography
 Davis, Ronald L. Hollywood Beauty: Linda Darnell and the American Dream. University of Oklahoma Press, 2014.

External links
 

1939 films
1939 drama films
American drama films
Films directed by Gregory Ratoff
20th Century Fox films
American black-and-white films
Films with screenplays by Kathryn Scola
Films about modeling
1930s English-language films
1930s American films